Johnnie Walker, MBE (born Peter Waters Dingley; 30 March 1945) is an English radio disc jockey and broadcaster. He began his career on pirate radio, most notably on Radio Caroline. He joined BBC Radio 1 in 1969. He joined BBC Radio 2 in 1998 and currently presents Sounds of the 70s on Sunday afternoons and The Radio 2 Rock Show on Friday nights.

Early life
Walker's father sold electroplating equipment for car parts, at W. Canning & Co. Johnnie Walker was educated at two independent schools in Solihull. He attended Ruckleigh School until the age of eight and went on to Solihull School, where he enjoyed music lessons and playing rugby, but he failed his O-Level examinations. He then was a garage manager apprentice, studied for a City and Guilds qualification in motor mechanics at Gloucester Technical College and aspired to be a car salesman, before becoming a DJ in bars and ballrooms.

Early career

Offshore radio
Walker's broadcasting began in May 1966 on offshore (pirate) radio station Swinging Radio England, before moving to Radio Caroline. When government action forced the pirate stations to close in 1967, three presenters were still broadcasting: Walker, Robbie Dale and Ross Brown.

BBC Radio 1
Walker joined BBC Radio 1 in April 1969, presenting a two-hour Saturday show from 2 to 4pm. A year later, in 1970, Walker presented a one-hour weekday morning slot from 9 to 10am, moving to the weekday early afternoon show in 1971, from 1 to 3pm, which then went out from noon to 2pm in 1973. The show featured the music quiz "Pop the Question" and the Tuesday chart rundown as the new weekly chart was published from the research figures provided by the British Market Research Bureau (BMRB) on Tuesdays at this time.

United States
In 1976, Walker had a dispute with station management over the music he played, and about how it was deemed to "not fit" the station's daytime music line-up. He was also reprimanded for criticising The Bay City Rollers – then at the height of their popularity – on air, describing them as "musical garbage". As a result, he left Radio 1 for a while and moved to the United States, where he stayed for five years. During his time in the states Walker worked for radio stations KSAN in San Francisco,  KPFA in Berkeley, California, in January 1981, WHFS in Bethesda, Maryland, and also recorded some shows for Radio Luxembourg, until he taped a record at the wrong speed, while partying in the studio. He was also involved in Deaf Club and Silicon Valley real estate.

Return to UK

Local radio
Walker returned to the UK in the early 1980s and in 1982 presented Radio West's evening show The Modern World. In September 1983 he joined Wiltshire Radio, presenting the 11am2pm slot. He was subsequently heard on GWR, which was formed out of the merger of Radio West and Wiltshire Radio.

Return to Radio 1
On 17 January 1987, Walker re-joined Radio 1, presenting the Saturday afternoon show The Stereo Sequence (so named owing to the fact that at the time, Radios 1 and 2 shared the same FM frequencies, with much of Radio 1's output transmitted on medium wave only at times when Radio 2 were in occupation of the FM frequency). The show was later renamed The Saturday Sequence once Radio 1 began regular FM broadcasting in the late 1980s; the shows ran from 2pm to 7:30pm, before Roger Scott took over in mid-1988. In July 1988, he was briefly heard on Richard Branson's syndicated service The Superstation which provided overnight programming to some ILR stations.

BBC GLR and BBC Radio 5
In October 1988, Walker was one of the original presenters on the new BBC local station in London BBC GLR, as part of a lineup which included Nick Abbot, Emma Freud, Tommy Vance and Dave Pearce and was run by future Radio 1 controller Matthew Bannister. Walker presented the weekday slot from noon to 3pm. Then after a few months, he took over from Emma Freud from 10am to 1pm.

In 1990, Walker joined the newly-launched BBC Radio 5, presenting This Family Business three days a week on Mondays, Wednesdays and Fridays from 11am to 12.30pm. As a result, he took over the weekday show on BBC GLR from 7 to 9pm, where he remained until later that year, when he was dismissed from the station by Matthew Bannister after making commenting that people would be "dancing in the streets" following the resignation of Margaret Thatcher as prime minister.

Following his dismissal from BBC GLR, he took the BBC Radio 5 show five days a week and his show was expanded to 9:30am to noon Mondays to Fridays and was rebranded as The AM Alternative. He remained with Radio 5 until March 1994 when the station re-launched as BBC Radio 5 Live.

Return to Radio 1
In September 1991, as well as presenting for Radio 5, Walker returned to Radio 1, taking over from Richard Skinner on The Saturday Sequence (renamed from its original The Stereo Sequence, as that appellation was now deemed irrelevant as both Radios 1 and 2 had by then long had their own separate stereo FM frequencies) every Saturday from 3 to 7pm. He went out from 3 to 6pm in March 1992.

He remained until October 1993, moving to Saturday the 711pm slot, before moving back to Saturday afternoons in November 1994 from 2 to 5pm, where he remained until he left Radio 1 for good in October 1995.

In early 1996, Walker joined London talk station LBC, presenting the weekend programme from 6 to 10am. In addition, he was heard on Classic Gold stations around the UK on Saturday from noon to 2pm.

BBC Radio 2
In 1997, in addition to his Classic Gold shows, Walker was on BBC Radio 2 presenting documentaries and filling in for presenters.

In April 1998, Walker was offered his own weekly show on Radio 2, Saturday from 3:30 to 5:30pm, then six months later, as well as Saturday afternoons, Walker took over from John Dunn from 5 to 7pm Monday to Thursday. Des Lynam presented Friday's edition.

In early 1999, Walker's show was temporarily suspended after he became the subject of a tabloid exposé over his cocaine use. He was temporarily suspended by the BBC when the drug allegations were published in the News of the World in April 1999. He was subsequently fined £2,000 for possession of cocaine. During Walker's absence, Richard Allinson filled in for him on Drivetime while Billy Bragg took over Saturday afternoon. Walker returned to his drivetime show, now presenting from Monday to Friday, towards the end of 1999. Janice Long then took over Saturday afternoons.

Illness announced
Walker told listeners in June 2003 that he was suffering from cancer. He ended his show by stating he was beginning treatment and would be taking time off to recover, after which he played "Bridge over Troubled Water" by Simon & Garfunkel. Stuart Maconie filled in for him, then on Thursday 24 July 2003, the BBC announced that Noel Edmonds would join Radio 2 to present Drivetime for eight weeks. Edmonds took over from Monday 4 August until Friday 3 October. Walker's recovery continued, but there was to be no return after Edmonds. Stuart Maconie continued as stand-in, and at the beginning of Monday 6 October's Drivetime show, he played Bruce Springsteen's "Born to Run" for Walker, remarked that he was "doing well", and that he was due to return at the end of the year.

On 12 February 2004, Radio 2 announced Walker would return on 1 March. This was followed by his own message, "Well, it's taken a lot longer than I originally thought, but I reckon I'm fit enough now to come back to the Drive Time show on Monday 1 March. I'd like to thank Jim Moir and Lesley Douglas for keeping the door open for me all this time, and also to Stuart Maconie for doing such a great job on the show while I've been away. And a huge thank you to Radio 2 listeners for all their wonderful support since I left the show in June 2003. I've been very lucky to have had so many good wishes and kindness sent in my direction, it helped enormously with my recovery – thank you so much. It will be great for us to be re-united again from 1 March."

Walker returned on 1 March, with his first record being Eric Clapton's "Hello Old Friend". Walker and Clapton were born on the same day and Walker later presented a Radio 2 show to celebrate the fact that they were both turning sixty.

He was made an MBE in the New Year Honours 2006.

New projects
In February 2006 it was announced that Walker would step down as host of Radio 2 Drivetime to take over from Ed Stewart on Sunday afternoons and conduct interviews with musicians. His last Drivetime show was on 31 March, with Neil Diamond as a guest. The final song played by Walker on the show was "Human Touch" by Bruce Springsteen. From 23 April, Walker took over a show on Sundays from 5 to 7 pm. As well as his Sunday show, Walker also deputised for Brian Matthew on Sounds of the 60s when Matthew had to temporarily step down due to ill health. Walker presented the show from 2 September to 25 November 2006, when he too had to step down for medical reasons. He returned to the programme on 6 January 2007 and continued to host the show until Matthew's return on 10 February. He also returned to his own Sunday show the following day.

Since 2007
From 28 January 2007, his Sunday show was broadcast from 4:30 to 6:30pm. In addition, he also deputised for Terry Wogan on Radio 2's Breakfast show up until the end of 2009. His autobiography was published on 31 May 2007 – while the previous year another book, Johnnie Walker – Cruisin' The Formats, put his radio work in the context of radio development over forty years.

From 9 to 14 August 2007, Walker was one of several former pirate radio disc jockeys at BBC Essex's six-day revival of pirate radio marking the 40th anniversary of the Marine Offences Act. He was also part of "Pirate BBC Essex" programmes broadcast over Easter 2009 to celebrate 45 years since the launch of Radio Caroline.

On Saturday 7 February 2009, Walker began a new ten-week series called Pirate Johnnie Walker on BBC Radio 2. This show recreated the sounds of pirate radio from the 1960s, and had other Pirate DJs from the era as guests.

From 5 April 2009, Walker started a new Sunday afternoon (35pm) show on Radio 2 called Sounds of the 70s. The show was previously presented by Steve Harley, who broadcast his final show on Thursday 27 March 2008, but parts of the format are different and often features interviews with guest artistes.

On 30 March 2012, he launched his "Alternative Johnnie Walker" podcast which aimed to "Open the door to an alternative view of the world featuring inspirational and radical thinkers dedicated to improving life on Planet Earth."

In January 2019, it was announced that Walker would step down from The Rock Show and Sounds of the 70s "for a number of weeks", to receive treatment for a heart condition. He returned to Radio 2 on 16 March.

Since March 2020, Walker has broadcast from his home in Shaftesbury, Dorset, with contributions from his wife Tiggy. The couple also collaborate on a podcast called Consciously Coupling.
On August 14th 2022 Walker hosted a show on Boom Radio as part of the station's celebration of Offshore Radio. At midnight, on that date in 1967, the Marine Offences Act came into force, outlawing the pirates.

Other work
Walker has done voice-over work for television adverts. He has appeared on GMTV several times, and was an advisor to the film The Boat That Rocked, released in April 2009.
On 29 June 2009, whilst covering for Terry Wogan on BBC Radio 2, Walker said that for many years he and another DJ, Chris Bull, had been responsible for playing the records between sets on the Pyramid stage at the Glastonbury Festival, an important role as it "sets the mood" for the next act. His wife, Tiggy, had suggested playing Oasis' "Wonderwall" before Bruce Springsteen's set two days earlier — an inspired choice that soon had the crowd singing along. From the crowd's reaction, Walker turned to Bull, saying "How are we going to follow that?".

Walker and his wife Tiggy have both cared for each other through serious illness, and are patrons of Carers UK. After having been diagnosed herself with breast cancer in 2013, in September 2015 Tiggy published the book Unplanned Journey, a photographic journal charting her experience of cancer diagnosis and treatment. All royalties from the book are to be donated to Carers UK. Walker also compered the Concert at the Kings show in 2015.

Personal life
Walker has two children from his first marriage to Frances Kum in 1971, which ended in divorce in 2000. He married Tiggy Jarvis (born 26 December 1960) on 21 December 2002. His long-time friend singer-songwriter Gordon Haskell was in attendance, having dated Tiggy a year previously, before introducing her to Walker.     

Walker is a 2013 recipient of the BASCA Gold Badge Award, for "individuals who make outstanding contributions to Britain's music and entertainment industry, sponsored annually by PRS for Music. In 2014 Walker and his wife became patrons on Carers UK.

Walker's hobbies include photography, backgammon and travelling in a campervan. He is also known for his love of Harley-Davidson motorcycles.

Works

Further reading

References

External links

The Rock Show with Johnnie Walker (BBC Radio 2)
Sounds of the 70s with Johnnie Walker (BBC Radio 2)
Music played on Johnnie's shows
Johnnie's Jukebox, a curated playlist from listeners nominations
Johnnie Walker, British special on KSAN live radio at Museum of Performance & Design via ArchiveGrid
Martin Clarke. live tape list
 Tom Read M1EYP, G-20843, BDXC-1040 Pirate BBC Essex 2007
Greil Marcus. Real Life Rock 1978-07-31

Living people
1945 births
English radio DJs
Offshore radio broadcasters
Pirate radio personalities
BBC Radio 2 presenters
BBC Radio 1 presenters
People educated at Solihull School
People from Olton
Members of the Order of the British Empire
Top of the Pops presenters